Deathmasques (1993) is an original novel written by Dave Stone and based on the long-running British science fiction comic strip Judge Dredd. It also features the character Detective-Judge Armitage, who appears in his own series in the Judge Dredd Megazine.

Synopsis
A deadly creature of self-aware energy which can possess the body of any living being is at large, and Judge Dredd must follow it across the Atlantic to Brit-Cit to destroy it.

Continuity
Armitage and Dredd meet again in Dave Stone's sequel, The Medusa Seed (1994).

External links
Deathmasques at the 2000 AD website.

Novels by Dave Stone
Judge Dredd novels